MetaCDN is a cloud-based content delivery network company that also offers video transcoding, streaming video and web accelerator services.

Founded in 2011 from research out of the University of Melbourne, MetaCDN is backed by Australian venture capital firm Starfish Ventures and the University of Melbourne's commercialization arm.

MetaCDN leverages services such as Amazon Web Services, Edgecast, and Windows Azure to offer users access to an integrated global network for content delivery. As of July 2012, the company reported having 102 access points in 5 continents on their website.

StreamShark.io
In September 2015 MetaCDN  rebranded its live streaming platform to StreamShark. The launch of StreamShark included a complete rebuild of the live streaming & video on demand platform.

References

Companies based in Melbourne
Content delivery networks